The Chief Minister of Balochistan is the head of government of the Pakistani province of Balochistan. The chief minister leads the legislative branch of the provincial government, and is elected by the Provincial Assembly. Given that he has the confidence of the assembly, the chief minister's term is for five years and is subject to no term limits.  Abdul Quddus Bizenjo is the current chief minister of Balochistan.

The Chief Minister of Balochistan is elected by the Provincial Assembly of Balochistan to serve as the head of the provincial government in Balochistan, Pakistan. The current Chief Minister is Abdul Quddus Bizenjo since 29 October 2021.

List of chief ministers of Balochistan

See also
 Governor of Balochistan
 Government of Balochistan
 Chief Secretary Balochistan
 Provincial Assembly of Balochistan
 List of Chief Ministers in Pakistan
 List of Governors of Pakistan
 Chief Minister of Khyber Pakhtunkhwa
 Chief Minister of Punjab (Pakistan)
 Chief Minister of Sindh

References

External links
Chief Minister of Balochistan

Balochistan
 
Government of Balochistan, Pakistan